Carlos Berlocq and Leonardo Mayer were the defending champions, but chose not to participate that year.

Brian Dabul and Sebastián Prieto won in the final 6-3, 6-3 against Tomasz Bednarek and Mateusz Kowalczyk.

Seeds

  Sanchai Ratiwatana /  Sonchat Ratiwatana (semifinals)
  Brian Dabul /  Sebastián Prieto (champions)
  Jonathan Marray /  Jamie Murray (semifinals)
  David Martin /  Frank Moser (first round)

Draw

Draw

External links
Main Draw

Prime Cup Aberto de Sao Paulo - Doubles
2010 - Doubles
2010 in Brazilian tennis